Osman Bülent Kayabaş (25 August 1945 – 19 April 2017) was a Turkish actor. He appeared in more than one hundred films from 1963 to 2017.

He is particularly notable for his villain role in the 1973 film Karateci Kız where his character's dramatic and seemingly unending death —dubbed "Worst movie death scene ever"—became a viral hit, gaining millions of views since it was highlighted online in 2012. It was parodied in a  Regular Show episode.

He died from colorectal cancer in 2017.

Selected filmography

References

External links 

1945 births
2017 deaths
Turkish male film actors
Deaths from cancer in Turkey
Deaths from colorectal cancer